Lothian Island Wildlife Sanctuary is situated in South 24 Parganas district, West Bengal, India. The wildlife in this sanctuary includes estuarine crocodiles, olive ridley sea turtles, spotted deer, jungle cats and rhesus macaques.

The tropical wetland forest consists of mangrove vegetation that provides a dense cover along the habitat.

References

 West Bengal Wildlife Sanctuaries

Islands of West Bengal
Geography of South 24 Parganas district
Sundarbans
Wildlife sanctuaries in West Bengal
1976 establishments in West Bengal
Protected areas established in 1976
Tourist attractions in South 24 Parganas district